Khalilou Fadiga (born 30 December 1974) is a Senegalese former professional footballer who played as a midfielder. He also holds a Belgian passport.

Club career

Early career
Fadiga moved to France when he was six years old. Fadiga began his career at Paris Saint-Germain in France, but failed to make an impression, and so was transferred to fellow Parisian club, Red Star, before moving to Belgian club RFC Liège.

Lommel
It was in Belgium that he found the profile that was to launch his international career. After one season he moved from FC Liège to Lommel, which is now KVSK United. He played two seasons at Lommel before he was spotted by Club Brugge.

Club Brugge
Fadiga quickly became a fan favorite. He scored nine goals in 67 appearances. In September 2000, the midfielder returned to France when he signed for AJ Auxerre.

Auxerre
In all, he played in 82 league games for the French club, scoring 10 goals as well as appearing in the Champions League and UEFA Cup during season 2002–03. In his final season at Auxerre he helped them win the 2002–03 Coupe de France, playing in the final as they defeated Paris St Germain.

Internazionale
Fadiga moved to Inter Milan in the summer of 2003, but the discovery of heart problems did not allow him to feature for the Italian club, apart from appearing in a few friendly games during the Summer. He was released from the San Siro side after just one season, but decided against retirement despite the heart problems.

Bolton Wanderers
English club Bolton Wanderers signed Fadiga for the 2004–05 season, after he passed a medical. However, before he made an appearance for Bolton, he collapsed prior to a match in October, and had to be fitted with a defibrillator due to an irregular heartbeat. Despite stating his desire to return to the game, medical specialists urged him to retire, warning that if during a game his chest was knocked the defibrillator could fail, leading to instant death. However, following a period of rest and passing a medical, Fadiga returned to the Bolton squad in early 2005 and played in five games.

At the start of the 2005–06 campaign Fadiga was loaned to Derby County of the Football League Championship, making four appearances. On his return to the Reebok Stadium he took part in ten games, two of them in the UEFA Cup, before eventually being released in May 2006.

Coventry City
Without a club at the start of the 2006–07 season, he went on trial with Portsmouth and played for their reserve team. He also had trials at Watford and Hull City before eventually signing a four-month contract with Coventry City on 23 February 2007. In April 2007 he suffered a serious Achilles injury in the home game against Preston and it ended his time at Coventry.

Return to Belgium
He has since been released and returned to his wife's homeland signing with AA Gent. After one year he moved in June 2008 to K.F.C. Germinal Beerschot, but left Beerschot after short time in December 2008. He signed for Third Division club KSV Temse in 2011 before retiring from the game.

Personal life
Fadiga is married with a Belgian and has two kids, Noah and Naoel. Noah followed in his footsteps as a professional footballer.

Career statistics
Scores and results list Senegal's goal tally first, score column indicates score after each Fadiga goal.

References

External links

1974 births
Living people
Association football midfielders
Senegalese footballers
Senegal international footballers
Paris Saint-Germain F.C. players
Red Star F.C. players
Club Brugge KV players
AJ Auxerre players
Inter Milan players
Bolton Wanderers F.C. players
Derby County F.C. players
Coventry City F.C. players
2002 FIFA World Cup players
French footballers
French sportspeople of Senegalese descent
Senegalese emigrants to France
Naturalised citizens of Belgium
Belgian people of Senegalese descent
Belgian footballers
Footballers from Dakar
Footballers from Île-de-France
Ligue 1 players
Belgian Pro League players
Premier League players
K.A.A. Gent players
Beerschot A.C. players
Senegalese expatriate footballers
French expatriate footballers
Belgian expatriate footballers
Senegalese expatriate sportspeople in England
Expatriate footballers in England
Expatriate footballers in Italy
2000 African Cup of Nations players
Senegalese expatriate sportspeople in Italy
French expatriate sportspeople in Italy
Belgian expatriate sportspeople in Italy
French expatriate sportspeople in England
Belgian expatriate sportspeople in England
2002 African Cup of Nations players